The 1935 New Hampshire Wildcats football team was an American football team that represented the University of New Hampshire as a member of the New England Conference during the 1935 college football season. In its 20th season under head coach William "Butch" Cowell, the team compiled a 2–5–1 record, being outscored by their opponents 55–120. The team scored 47 of their points in two shutout wins, and only eight total points in their other six games. All five losses came in away games; the team had two wins and a tie at home. The team played its home games in Durham, New Hampshire, at Memorial Field.

The November 9 win over Tufts was the last football game the Wildcats played at Memorial Field, as home games moved to Lewis Field (now named Wildcat Stadium) the following season, where the program has remained.

Head coach Cowell was in ill health at the start of the season, with Ernest Christensen, one of his assistants, leading the team as they prepared for their first game. Cowell retired from coaching after the 1936 season; he died in August 1940 at the age of 53.

Schedule

Two of Yale's touchdowns on October 5 were scored by Clint Frank, who went on to win the Heisman Trophy in 1937. The 1935 game remains the only time that the Yale and New Hampshire football programs have met. The November 2 game versus Boston University was the first Wildcat home football game broadcast on radio; it was carried on WHEB (AM) of Portsmouth, New Hampshire; the game was also attended by Styles Bridges, then Governor of New Hampshire.

Wildcat captain Milton Johnson later had a brief pre-season stint with the 1938 Washington Redskins, and may have played with the Boston Shamrocks that season.

Notes

References

New Hampshire
New Hampshire Wildcats football seasons
New Hampshire Wildcats football